Last Chance Learners was an Australian television program which was created by the Seven Network. The show gave ten learner drivers the chance to be trained by an experienced driving instructor and the opportunity to take their driver's licence test and win a brand new Hyundai Getz.

Last Chance Learners premiered on Wednesday 18 April 2007 at 7:30pm on Channel Seven and was hosted by former Test cricketer and Who Dares Wins host Mike Whitney. After the conclusion of the series final on 4 July 2007, the Seven Network planned a live reunion special, also hosted by Whitney, where all ten learners would talk about their experiences on the show and answer questions from a live studio audience. The special also planned to give away the remaining Hyundai Getzs to lucky home viewers. However, the reunion special was cancelled. Repeats have been shown on 7Two.

The series was also broadcast in the UK on Living2 as Desperate Learners Driving School.

The learner drivers
The ten learner drivers were split up into two teams of five learner drivers each. Each team had its own dedicated driving instructor. The red team instructor was Jann Shipley while the blue team instructor was Chris Breen.

Red Team

Blue Team

Episodes

External links
 Official LCL Myspace
 
 Australia DKT Test

Seven Network original programming
2007 Australian television series debuts
Driver's education